Rose Hill Township is an inactive township in Johnson County, in the U.S. state of Missouri.

Rose Hill Township was established in 1849, taking its name from the community of Rose Hill, Missouri.

References

Townships in Missouri
Townships in Johnson County, Missouri